Dionysis "Sakis" Skoulidas (alternate spelling: Dionisis) (Greek: Διονύσης "Σάκης" Σκουλίδας; born July 29, 1997) is a Greek professional basketball player for Eleftheroupoli Kavalas of the Greek 2nd Division. Born in Maroussi, Athens, Greece, he is a 2.01 m (6'7") tall small forward.

Youth career
Skoulidas played from a young age with the youth teams of AEK Peristeriou and Peristeri, before he started his pro career.

Professional career
Skoulidas played for the first time in the top-tier level Greek Basket League, on 11 April 2012, at the age of 14. That was the only game that he played in during the 2011–12 Greek League season. The rest of that season, he played in Peristeri's youth club.

In the next season, 2012–13, he only played in Peristeri's youth club. In the 2013–14 and 2014–15 seasons, he played with Peristeri in the 3rd-tier level semi pro level Greek B League. Skoulidas signed his first professional contract with the senior men's team of Peristeri in 2015, at the age of 18, after he rejected an offer from AEK Athens, and renewed his contract with Peristeri, in order to have more playing time. In the subsequent 2015–16 season, he played with Peristeri in the Greek 2nd Division.

In July 2016, Skoulidas moved to AEK Athens. He was loaned to Koroivos Amaliadas for the 2017–18 season. After that, he moved with a free agent transfer to Holargos in July 2018.

National team career
With the Greek Under-16 junior national team, Skoulidas played at the 2012 FIBA Europe Under-16 Championship. He also played with Greece at the 2013 TBF Under-16 World Cup in Sakarya, Turkey, where he helped Greece win the gold medal. He also played at the 2013 FIBA Europe Under-16 Championship, where he won a bronze medal.

Skoulidas also played at the 2014 FIBA Europe Under-18 Championship, the 2015 FIBA Under-19 World Cup, the 2015 FIBA Europe Under-18 Championship, where he won a gold medal, and the 2nd division 2016 FIBA Europe Under-20 Championship Division B, where he won a bronze medal. He also played at the 2017 FIBA Europe Under-20 Championship, where he won a gold medal.

Career statistics

Domestic Leagues

Regular season

|-
| 2016–17
| style="text-align:left;"| A.E.K.
| align=center | GBL
| 13 || 5.5 || .300 || .286 || - || .9 || .5 || .1 || 0 || .6
|-
| 2017–18
| style="text-align:left;"| Koroivos
| align=center | GBL
| 26 || 18.1 || .427 || .373 || .700 || 2.3 || 1.0 || .5 || 0 || 3.2
|-
| 2018–19
| style="text-align:left;"| Holargos
| align=center | GBL
| 16 || 7.3 || .240 || .267 || - || .3 || .3 || .2 || 0 || 1.0
|}

FIBA Champions League

|-
| style="text-align:left;" | 2016–17
| style="text-align:left;" | A.E.K.
| 9 || 6.2 || .250 || .007 || 1.000 || .6 || .2 || 0 || 0 || 1.2
|}

References

External links
FIBA Profile
RealGM.com Profile
Eurobasket.com Profile
Greek Basket League Profile 
Greek Basket League Profile 
Hellenic Federation Profile 
Draftexpress.com Profile
NBADraft.net Profile

1997 births
Living people
AEK B.C. players
Charilaos Trikoupis B.C. players
Greek men's basketball players
Holargos B.C. players
Koroivos B.C. players
Olympiacos B.C. B players
Peristeri B.C. players
Shooting guards
Small forwards
Basketball players from Athens